Michael Schuhmacher (born 20 August 1957) is a retired German football player.

External links

1957 births
Living people
1. FC Kaiserslautern players
Borussia Mönchengladbach players
KFC Uerdingen 05 players
SG Wattenscheid 09 players
1. FSV Mainz 05 players
Bundesliga players
German footballers
Association football defenders